This is a list of fellows of the Royal Society elected in 1997.

Fellows

Christopher Michael Bate 
Sir J. Michael Brady
Michael George Bulmer 
John Boscawen Burland 
Richard Dickinson Chambers 
Colin Whitcomb Clark 
David Charles Clary 
Laurence Eaves 
Richard Alan Fortey 
Christopher David Garner 
Douglas Owen Gough 
Edward John Hinch 
James Julian Bennett Jack 
Paul Gordon Jarvis  (1935-2013) 
Kuen Charles Kao 
Eric Barrington Keverne 
Philip Joseph Kocienski 
Peter Benedict Kronheimer 
Philippa Charlotte Marrack 
James Rankin Maxwell 
Timothy John Mitchison 
Richard Graham Michael Morris 
Christopher Miles Perrins 
George Richard Pickett 
George Henry Poste 
Kenneth Bannerman Milne Reid 
Alan Bernard Rickinson 
Leo Sachs 
Giacinto Scoles 
James Scott 
Wilson Sibbett 
Bernard Walter Silverman 
Sir Richard Sykes 
Richard Edward Taylor 
Neil Sidney Trudinger 
Robin Anthony Weiss 
Simon David Manton White 
Alan Hardwick Windle 
Richard Dean Wood 
Graham Charles Wood

Foreign members

Thomas Eisner  (1929–2011) 
Walter Jakob Gehring 
Roy J Glauber 
Martin David Kruskal  (1925–2006) 
George Andrew Olah 
Stanley Ben Prusiner

References

1997
1997 in science
1997 in the United Kingdom